Liuyuan Subdistrict may refer to:
Liuyuan Subdistrict, Jiangsu, a township-level division of Gusu District, Suzhou, Jiangsu, China
Liuyuan Subdistrict, Shandong, China